Tamchekket is a department of Hodh El Gharbi Region in Mauritania.

References 

Departments of Mauritania